Paleohispanic may refer to:

 Paleohispanic languages
 Paleohispanic scripts